Hadem (Arabic: حادم) is a masculine Arabic given name.

Notable bearers
 Hadem Rida, Palestinian mayor of Jenin

Arabic masculine given names